Family Policy Alliance of Kansas is a conservative Christian lobbying group and the state affiliate of Family Policy Alliance in Kansas. The affiliate was previously known as Kansas Family Research Institute.

Policies 

President Eric Teetsel named a Kansas bathroom bill  legislation to exclude transgender individuals from restrooms which conform to their gender identity  the organization's "number one policy priority" in 2017. Teetsel provided the Kansas legislature with a resolution to "oppose all efforts to validate a transgender identity."

The organization has also advocated against legal same-sex marriage, and believes that business owners should be allowed to decline service to LGBT customers.

Teetsel describes these policies as "an important way we demonstrate love for our neighbors."

References

Religion in Kansas
Politics of Kansas
Organizations that oppose LGBT rights in the United States